Sharon Lee Percy Rockefeller (born December 10, 1944) is the wife of former West Virginia Senator John Davison "Jay" Rockefeller IV and served as that state's First Lady from 1977 to 1985. On November 21, 2019, she was awarded the National Medal of Arts by President Donald Trump.

Life 
Rockefeller was born in Oakland, California, on December 10, 1944, a twin daughter of Senator Charles Harting Percy (1919—2011) and Jeanne Valerie Dickerson, who died in 1947. She earned a Bachelor's degree at Stanford University and later studied at Morris Harvey College and West Virginia Wesleyan College. Her twin sister Valerie was murdered in 1966 at the family home by a mysterious intruder. Sharon married John Davison "Jay" Rockefeller IV (born 1937) in 1967. He is the son of John Davison Rockefeller III (1906—1978) and Blanchette Ferry Hooker (1909—1992) of the Rockefeller family. She and Jay have four children and seven grandchildren.

In 2005 Percy Rockefeller was diagnosed with colon cancer, undergoing chemotherapy and radiation therapy. Her cancer has since metastasized in the bones. Her experience prompted her to convince film maker Ken Burns to produce the 2015 documentary Cancer: The Emperor of All Maladies.  It is adapted from the book of the same name by Siddhartha Mukherjee.

The Rockefellers live in the Northwest district of Washington, DC and retain their permanent residence in Charleston, West Virginia.

Career 
As First Lady of West Virginia, Rockefeller promoted the Public Broadcasting Service, helped establish a centralized system to assist mentally disabled children, and founded Mountain Artisans, a quilting business for low-income artisans. She also campaigned to lower utility costs and to improve care for the elderly. 

After Jay was elected to the United States Senate in 1985, she became chief executive officer of WETA-TV in Washington, D.C. She later became chairwoman of the Corporation for Public Broadcasting. 

She is a former member of the Steering Committee of the Bilderberg Group. She has also been the chairperson of the National Gallery of Art.

References

External links 
 Sharon Percy Rockefeller biography, WETA
 Sharon Percy Rockefeller Profile - Forbes.com

1944 births
Living people
American women chief executives
American media executives
First Ladies and Gentlemen of West Virginia
National Gallery of Art
Members of the Steering Committee of the Bilderberg Group
People from Charleston, West Virginia
People from Chicago
Businesspeople from Oakland, California
Rockefeller family
Stanford University alumni
National Humanities Medal recipients
American twins
George Washington University trustees
Morris Harvey College alumni
California Democrats
United States National Medal of Arts recipients